A vacation spot may be:

a park
see also wilderness
other tourist attractions
a bed and breakfast
a luxury resort
a megaresort
a resort town
a seaside resort
a ski resort
a "tourist trap"

See also
Lists of tourist attractions
Tourist attractions in the United States